Helen Foster (May 23, 1906 – December 25, 1982) was an American film actress.

Early life and career
Born in Independence, Kansas, Foster attended school in Kansas City and later attended finishing school in Florida. She began acting in 1924, appearing in comedy shorts and early Westerns. In 1929, she had a role in her first sound film Gold Diggers of Broadway, and was also named a WAMPAS Baby Star that same year. In 1933, Foster starred in the exploitation film Road to Ruin, a remake of the 1928 film of the same name in which Foster also starred. Following the release of Road to Ruin, Foster made only eight more film appearances in mostly uncredited roles. She made her last onscreen appearance as an extra in the 1956 film Around the World in 80 Days.

Foster died on December 25, 1982, in Los Angeles at the age of 76.

Filmography

References

External links

 

Actresses from Kansas
American film actresses
People from Independence, Kansas
Western (genre) film actresses
20th-century American actresses
1906 births
1982 deaths
WAMPAS Baby Stars